Génial Olivier (Brilliant Olivier) is a humorous Belgian comic series about a child prodigy. Written and drawn by Jacques Devos, it first appeared in Spirou magazine in 1963 and lasted a quarter of a century, ending with Devos' retirement in 1988.

The series consisted mainly of one-page gags and short stories which covered several pages. There were few full-length adventures. The strip was also notable for the puns and jokes in the text.

Premise
Olivier Delabranche (i.e. Olive Branch) is a scientific genius well ahead of his time and his own age. Super-computers, various types of transport, robots, lifelike holograms, even the elixir of youth, he has invented the lot and more. Be it chemistry or technology, science holds few secrets from him. He qualifies for a dozen Nobel Prizes in those subjects and he is not yet a teenager !

Olivier is in fact a little boy of about 10. Unfortunately, the efforts of this child prodigy go largely unappreciated by the adult world, including parents and teachers. Whereas he should perhaps be in an advanced school where his talents would be developed (as if they needed to be) or even a top university, Olivier is in fact still stuck in a normal, everyday primary school.

The reason for this is that, science apart, in all other respects he is a dunce. In history, geography, spelling and grammar, Olivier is at the bottom of the class and the despair of his teacher, Mister Rectitude.

The Pupil and the Teacher
Most of the stories revolve around the relationship between the little genius and his more down-to-earth teacher, with whom he is engaged in a never-ending war of nerves (nerves being the operative word when it comes to the teacher). While Mister Rectitude tries desperately to maintain discipline, Olivier comes up with all kinds of inventions which cause chaos all over the school.

(As if to emphasize the conflict between teacher and pupil, the series was renamed M. Rectitude et Génial Olivier when published in book form.)

Olivier's greatest pleasure is to take an invention to school which he will use either to play pranks on Mister Rectitude and/or other pupils or members of staff, or come up with ways to cheat in the exams. This, plus his inattention in class or his tendency to chat with his friend Flafla, results in lines and after-school detentions. During these punishments, Olivier tries out some other invention which causes further agro for the teacher and his colleagues. This results in more detentions, more inventions and so on and so on...

In the latter years of the series, Olivier became more and more malevolent and his inventions tended to be destined solely to drive the education establishment (and Mister Rectitude in particular) besides themselves with exasperation.

Although not entirely a mad scientist himself, Olivier certainly knows how to drive other people crazy. But, as if perhaps trying to give the teaching profession its due, Devos did allow the ever-frustrated Mr Rectitude to get the last word on many occasions.

Characters

Titles
Olivier's adventures have not been published in English. Below is a list of the French book titles and their year of publication. Most of them are collections of one-page gags and short stories. Almost all the stories were written and drawn by Jacques Devos, with one being credited to Frédéric Jannin.

When the stories appeared in Spirou they were titled Génial Olivier, but the name was changed to M. Rectitude et Génial Olivier when published in book form.

1. L'école en folie 1974
2. Le génie et sa génération 1975
3. Génie, Vidi, Vici 1976
4. Un généreux génie gêné 1977
5. Le génie se surpasse 1984
6. Un ingénieux ingénieur génial 1978
7. Le passé recomposé 1979
8. Electrons, molécules et pensums 1980
9. L'électron et le blason 1981
10. Un génie ingénu 1982
11. Génie, péripéties et facéties 1983
12. Un génie est chez nous 1984
13. Un génie gai nickelé 1985
14. Un génie un peu nigaud 1986
15. Hi.Fi.Génie 1987
16. Le génie sans bouillir 1988
17. Le génie se multiplie 1989
18. Génial Olivier 1963
19. Le retour du génial Olivier 1964
20. Olivier baby-sitter 1966

Belgian comic strips
Genial Oliver
Fictional scientists in comics
Fictional inventors
Belgian comics characters
Genial Oliver
Genial Oliver
1963 comics debuts
Fictional Belgian people
Gag-a-day comics
Humor comics
Male characters in comics
Comics set in Belgium